Mycomya is a genus of fungus gnats in the family Mycetophilidae. There are at least 400 described species in Mycomya.

See also
 List of Mycomya species

References

Further reading

External links

 

Mycetophilidae
Articles created by Qbugbot
Sciaroidea genera